Central Presbyterian Church is a church in downtown Saint Paul, Minnesota, United States.  The congregation was founded in 1852 and built its first building in 1854, which was later enlarged during the 1870s.  The rapidly growing congregation outgrew the building, so they built a new church building in 1889.  The building, an example of Richardsonian Romanesque architecture, is listed on the National Register of Historic Places.

The arched entrances, a hallmark of the Richardsonian Romanesque style, feature a number of carved floral and geometric motifs.  The façade is coarsely carved Lake Superior brownstone with a massive 90-foot gable over the arches.  The architect, Warren H. Hayes, laid out the seating in the Akron Plan.  It features a raised semi-circular chancel, which places the speaker in the front of the congregation and at the center of the chancel.  The pews are curved and laid out in a semi-circular pattern on a sloping floor.  This design, similar to a theater's design, allows each person to see and hear the speaker.

References

External links
 
 Central Presbyterian Church

19th-century Presbyterian church buildings in the United States
Akron Plan church buildings
Churches completed in 1900
Churches in Saint Paul, Minnesota
Churches on the National Register of Historic Places in Minnesota
National Register of Historic Places in Saint Paul, Minnesota
Presbyterian churches in Minnesota
Richardsonian Romanesque architecture in Minnesota
Romanesque Revival church buildings in Minnesota